Maurice Scollard Baldwin (21 June 1836 – 19 October 1904) was a Canadian Anglican Bishop from Toronto, Upper Canada.

Baldwin was the son of John Spread Baldwin of Toronto. His parents were from influential families; he was the grandson of Æneas Shaw and the cousin of Robert Baldwin. He attended Upper Canada College and Trinity College, Toronto.

He was ordained a Deacon in 1860 and Priest in 1861. In 1865 he moved to Montreal as Incumbent of St. Luke's Church and in 1870 became assistant Rector of Christ Church Anglican Cathedral in Montreal and a Canon in 1871. On the death of the Very Rev. Dean Bethune in 1871, he was appointed to succeed him as Rector, and in 1879 made Dean of Montreal.

Noted for his evangelism and skillful oratory, he was elected the third Bishop of Huron in 1883, succeeding Isaac Hellmuth. He was less passionate about administrative matters than spiritual ones, but delegated such matters effectively. Under his leadership, the diocese adopted parliamentary rules for its synod, balanced its budget, and first broke off, then restored, its association with Western University of London, Ontario.

References

 Canadian Dictionary of Biography online

1836 births
1904 deaths
University of Toronto alumni
Trinity College (Canada) alumni
20th-century Anglican Church of Canada bishops
Deans of Montreal
Anglican bishops of Huron
Burials at St. James Cemetery, Toronto